Kunlun Fight World Combat Sports Center (Chinese: 昆仑决世界搏击中心; pinyin: Kūnlún jué shìjiè bójí zhōngxīn) is an indoor arena and a large gym in Beijing, China. The venue is a regular host to fight sports and other sporting events.

References

External links
 Kunlun Fight World Combat Sports Center on Baike

Buildings and structures in Beijing
Sport in Beijing
Indoor arenas in China
Sports venues in Beijing
Sports venues completed in 2016
Sports venues in China
Kickboxing in China
Boxing venues in China
Judo venues
Mixed martial arts venues in China
Taekwondo venues
Wrestling venues
Kickboxing training facilities
Mixed martial arts training facilities